Hystrivasum is an extinct genus of medium-sized fossil predatory gastropods in the family Turbinellidae. The species in this genus are known from the Pliocene and Pleistocene deposits of Florida.

Species 
Species within the genus Hystrivasum include:
 Hystrivasum horridum
 Hystrivasum jacksonense
 Hystrivasum locklini
 Hystrivasum squamosum

References

 E. H. Vokes. 1966. The genus Vasum (Mollusca: Gastropoda) in the new world. Tulane Studies in Geology and Paleontology 5(1):1-35

Turbinellidae
Pleistocene gastropods